Kendektamak (Kendektamaq) is a rural locality (a selo) in Nikolayevsky Selsoviet, Tuymazinsky District, Bashkortostan, Russia. The population was 475 as of 2010. There are 7 streets.

Geography 
Kendektamak is located 22 km southeast of Tuymazy (the district's administrative centre) by road. Novosukkulovo is the nearest rural locality.

References 

Rural localities in Tuymazinsky District